Cornufer trossulus is a species of frog in the family Ceratobatrachidae.
It is found in Papua New Guinea and Solomon Islands.
Its natural habitats are subtropical or tropical moist lowland forests, plantations, rural gardens, urban areas, and heavily degraded former forest.

References

trossulus
Taxonomy articles created by Polbot
Amphibians described in 1949